was one of the founders of the Japanese Scouting movement.

He graduated from Tsuwano Elementary School. He entered Himeji Junior High School, a state school run by Hyogo Prefecture, but dropped out due to family reasons.

In 1903, he became a student at Shimane Normal School.

In 1905, he received a full Elementary School Teacher's licence, and became a teacher at Tsuwano Elementary School.

In 1907, he went to Tokyo, and worked at Akasaka Jinjo High School.

It is reported that meetings consisted of events such as readings of children's stories and inspirational and improving stories, singing, excursions and group training, and were always extremely popular.

On October 7, 1913, Hasunuma Monzō and  had a discussion about youth education with Japan's ambassador to Russia , where Motono explained in detail about the Boy Scout principles and organization in Europe. They were greatly impressed, and told Koshiba how wonderful this organization was.

In 1920, he participated in the First World Scout Jamboree in England, together with Shimoda Toyomatsu and Richard Suzuki.

On April 13, 1921, he reorganized the Shūyōdan Yōnenbu to form the Tokyo Shōnengun ("Tokyo Youth Army"). This was the first youth group based on the British Boy Scout training methods to be founded in Japan.

On June 19, 1925, he died in his Tokyo home of heart failure, aged 42.

See also

External links 

https://web.archive.org/web/20181105085923/http://www.geocities.jp/higashikurume_bs/history.html

Sources 
Much of this article was translated from the equivalent article in the Japanese Wikipedia, as referenced on October 27, 2006.

Scouting in Japan
1884 births
1925 deaths
Japanese writers
Scouting pioneers